Thomas Barrow (born 1938 in Kansas City, Missouri) studied with Aaron Siskind at the Art Institute of Design, Chicago, and graduated with an MA in 1967. He has been at the forefront of a generation of photographers who came of age during the sixties counterculture and has worked with numerous experimental processes. In the 1970s he created his Cancellations series in which he manipulated his photographs of buildings and urban landscapes and used an ice pick to manipulate the negatives before printing. He has utilized different mediums such as spray paint and builder's caulk to disrupt the pictorial image. Often he physically deconstructs and reassembles his prints to draw attention to the materiality of the photograph. Barrow has filled multiple roles as curator, editor, educator, and practitioner during his career. He held the titles of curator, assistant director and editor at George Eastman House from 1965-1972. In 1976 Barrow began teaching photography at the University of New Mexico and became Director of the university's Art Museum in 1985.

Inspired by the atmospheric haze and the closeness to what he considers “pure photography,”  Barrow has worked intermittently with pinhole photography since 1997.  His work can be found in public collections worldwide, including the Los Angeles County Museum of Art, the Museum of Modern Art in New York, the Museum of Fine Arts in Houston, the Denver Art Museum, the San Francisco Museum of Modern Art,  the Art Institute of Chicago, the Center for Creative Photography, where Barrow's archive is held, and scores of others. Barrow has received two NEA Photographers Fellowships (1973, 1978).

Barrow has written Reading into Photography: Selected Essays, 1959-1980 (1982) and Cancellations (2012). He has co-authored multiple photography books including Photography New Mexico, Perspectives on Photography: Essays in Honor of Beaumont Newhall, and Stories from the Camera: Reflections on the Photograph

References 

Living people
1938 births
American photographers
American writers
School of the Art Institute of Chicago alumni